Teniola Aladese is a Nigerian actress, producer, and casting director.

Early life 
Aladese was born in Lagos State and studied Mass Communication at Covenant University.

Career 
Aladese worked as a production coordinator on more than 30 Africa Magic Original Films from 2013 to 2015. She came into the limelight after starring as Akweyon in 'Jemeji' on which she was also Production Manager.

In 2015, she appeared in Perfectly Flawed. In 2018, she was the line producer for 'Forbidden'.

Filmography

Awards and nominations 
In 2022, Aladese was nominated for The Future Awards Africa Prize for Acting. She won the Trailblazer award at the 2022 Africa Magic Viewers' Choice Awards.

References

External links

Living people
Year of birth missing (living people)
Covenant University alumni
AMVCA Trailblazer Award winners
21st-century Nigerian actors
Nigerian actresses
Nigerian film directors
Nigerian film producers
Yoruba actresses